Karin Mikkelsen is a Danish former international cricketer who represented the Danish national team between 1993 and 1999.

References

Living people
Danish women cricketers
Denmark women One Day International cricketers
Year of birth missing (living people)